The Pittsburgh Steelers, a professional American football team based in Pittsburgh, Pennsylvania, participated in the first NFL Draft prior to the 1936 season. The franchise changed its name to the Steelers prior to the 1940 season, to represent the city's heritage of producing steel.

The event, which is officially known as the "Player Selection Meeting", is held each April. The draft is used as the primary means to distribute newly available talent (primarily from college football) equitably amongst the teams. Selections are made in reverse order based on the previous season's record, i.e. the club with the worst record from the previous season selects first. Through 2009, only two exceptions were made to this order: the Super Bowl champion always selects last (32nd), and the Super Bowl loser is awarded the penultimate (31st) pick. Beginning in 2010, teams making the playoffs will be seeded in reverse order depending upon how far they advance. The draft consists of seven rounds. Teams have the option of trading selections for players, cash and/or other selections (including future year selections). Thus, it is not uncommon for a team's actual draft pick to differ from their assigned draft pick, or for a team to have extra or no draft picks in any round due to these trades. The Steelers have traded away their first-round pick eight times; they have had two first-round selections in two drafts.

The Steelers' first selection in the inaugural NFL draft was William Shakespeare, a halfback from Notre Dame. The Steelers have selected first overall three times, drafting Bill Dudley in 1942, Gary Glick in 1956 and Terry Bradshaw in 1970. The team has selected second overall once, and third overall four times. Through 2021, eight Steeler first-round picks have gone on to have playing careers deemed worthy of enshrinement into the Pro Football Hall of Fame: Bill Dudley, Len Dawson, Joe Greene, Terry Bradshaw, Franco Harris, Lynn Swann, Rod Woodson, Troy Polamalu, and Alan Faneca. The team's most recent first-round selection was Kenny Pickett, a quarterback from the University of Pittsburgh.

Key

Player selections

Notes
 The Steelers traded their 1939 pick (2nd overall) to the Chicago Bears.
 The Steelers traded their 1941 pick (3rd overall) to the Chicago Bears (3rd overall)
 This was a lottery bonus pick.
 The Steelers traded their 1958 pick (8th overall) to the San Francisco 49ers.
 The Steelers traded their 1959 pick (8th overall) to the San Francisco 49ers.
 The Steelers traded their 1961 pick (6th overall) to the San Francisco 49ers.
 The Steelers traded their 1963 pick (11th overall) to the Chicago Bears.
 The Steelers traded their 1965 pick (3rd overall) to the Chicago Bears.
 The Steelers traded their 1967 pick (9th overall) to the Green Bay Packers.
 The Steelers acquired the 1989 pick (24th overall) from the Minnesota Vikings.
 The Steelers traded their 1990 pick (17th overall) to the Dallas Cowboys for Dallas' 1990 pick (21st overall, obtained from Minnesota Vikings) and a third-round pick (82nd overall, obtained from San Francisco 49ers).
 The Steelers traded their 2001 pick (16th overall) to the New York Jets for their first-round pick (19th overall), their fourth-round pick (111th overall) and their sixth-round pick (181st overall).
 The Steelers traded their first-round pick (27th overall), third-round pick (92nd overall) and sixth-round pick (200th overall) to obtain the 2003 pick (16th overall).
 The Steelers obtained the 2006 pick from New York Giants by trading their first-round pick (32nd overall), their third-round pick (96th overall) and their fourth-round pick (129th overall).
 The Steelers traded their 2020 pick (18th overall) to the Miami Dolphins to acquire Minkah Fitzpatrick.

References

Specific

General

Pittsburgh Steelers
 
first-round draft picks